Chase F. Robinson (born 1963) is an American historian of Islam, who is currently Dame Jillian Sackler Director of the Arthur M. Sackler Gallery and the Freer Gallery of Art of the Smithsonian Institution. Prior to assuming this role, he served as President and Distinguished Professor at The Graduate Center at City University of New York. He was formerly a fellow of Wolfson College at the University of Oxford from 1993 until 2008. Robinson received his bachelor's degree from Brown University and his Ph.D. from Harvard University. Fluent in French, he spent his junior year of high school at School Year Abroad's France campus, and has additionally studied at The American University in Cairo and the Hebrew University of Jerusalem. He is the editor of the first volume of The New Cambridge History of Islam.

Selected publications
 Empire and Elites after the Muslim Conquest: The Transformation of Northern Mesopotamia. Cambridge, 2000.
 Islamic Historiography. Cambridge, 2003.
 A Medieval Islamic City Reconsidered: An Interdisciplinary Approach to Samarra. Oxford, 2001.
 Texts, Documents and Artefacts: Islamic Studies in Honour of D.S. Richards. Brill, Leiden, 2003.
 Abd al-Malik. Oxford, 2005.
 The Legacy of the Prophet: The Middle East and Islam, 600-1300. Cambridge, 2009.
 The New Cambridge History of Islam: Volume 1, The Formation of the Islamic World, Sixth to Eleventh Centuries. Cambridge University Press, Cambridge, 2010. (Editor)
Islamic Civilization in Thirty Lives: The First 1,000 Years. University of California Press, 2016.

References 

21st-century American historians
21st-century American male writers
Brown University alumni
City University of New York faculty
Fellows of Wolfson College, Oxford
Harvard University alumni
American historians of Islam
Living people
People from Newton, Massachusetts
Place of birth missing (living people)
Smithsonian Institution people
American male non-fiction writers
1963 births